The 2018 Volta a Portugal is the 80th edition of the Volta a Portugal cycle race and is held on 1 August to 12 August 2018. The race starts in Setúbal and finishes in Fafe.

Teams
The 21 teams invited to the race were:

Cyclists

By starting number

By team

By nationality 
The 131 riders that are competing in the 2018 Volta a Portugal originated from 26 different countries.

References

Volta a Portugal